Lyons Israel Ellis  was a British architectural firm. It was formed in 1934. The original partners were Edward Lyons and Lawrence Israel. Tom Ellis joined in 1947. The partnership closed in 1984.

The list of architects who worked for Lyons, Israel and Ellis includes James Stirling, Richard MacCormac, Rick Mather, James Gowan, John Miller, Neave Brown, Eldred Evans, Alan Colquhoun, David Gray and many others. David Gray became a partner in the firm in 1970 and the firm's name was changed to Lyons Israel Ellis Gray.

References

External links
  Lyons Israel Ellis Gray - Works  This book by the Architectural Association was published in 1988. The name Gray was added to the firm's title when David Gray became a partner in 1970. 
 Collection of photographs of buildings by Lyons Israel and Ellis taken by Iqbal Aalam
 RIBA Architecture Image Library photographs of buildings by Lyons Israel Ellis

Architecture firms based in London
Defunct companies of the United Kingdom
British companies established in 1934
1984 disestablishments in England